Třeboradice is a cadastral district in the municipal part Čakovice in the administrative district Prague 18 in Prague, Czech Republic, with a population of c. 700 people.

Sport
SK Třeboradice - football club

Timeline of important moments in Prague history
1120 Třeboradice founded as Třeboratice
1968 Třeboradice enclosed to Prague
2006 Started construction of urban settlement
2007 SK Třeboradice won Prague's league called "II. B třída"

External links 
Archive of historic photos

Districts of Prague